Afravandeh (also Romanized as Afrāvandeh; also known as Afrāneh and Farāvandeh) is a village in Chalanchulan Rural District, Silakhor District, Dorud County, Lorestan Province, Iran. At the 2006 census, its population was 567, in 142 families.

References 

Towns and villages in Dorud County